Stephen David Heath (born 7 July 1967) is an English former first-class cricketer.

Heath was born at Bristol in July 1967. He was educated at King Edward's School in Birmingham, before going up to Trinity College, Cambridge. While studying at Cambridge, he played first-class cricket for Cambridge University Cricket Club from 1986 to 1988, making ten appearances. Playing as a middle order batsman in the Cambridge side, Heath scored 170 runs at an average of 11.33, with his highest score being 33 not out.

References

External links

1970 births
Living people
Cricketers from Bristol
People educated at King Edward's School, Birmingham
Alumni of Trinity College, Cambridge
English cricketers
Cambridge University cricketers